The First Priority Music Family: Basement Flavor is a hip hop compilation album, released on December 15, 1988, on First Priority/Atlantic Records. The single "I'm Not Havin' It" by Positive K and MC Lyte peaked at #16 on the Billboard Hot Rap Singles chart in 1989.

Track listing

References

Hip hop compilation albums
1988 compilation albums
Atlantic Records compilation albums